GATAD2B-associated neurodevelopmental disorder is a rare genetic neurodevelopmental disorder which is characterized by severe intellectual disabilities, speech delays, hypotonia and facial dysmorphia.

Signs and symptoms 

The following is a list of all the symptoms:

 Moderate to severe intellectual disabilities
 Speech delay
 Macrocephaly
 Childhood low muscle tone
 Feeding problems
 Variable cardiac anomalies
 Facial dysmorphisms

Additional symptoms include polyhydramnios and epilepsy.

Causes 
This condition is caused by  either (usually sporadic or de novo) alterations or a deletion of the GATAD2B gene, located in chromosome 1. In familial cases, inheritance is usually autosomal dominant.

Epidemiology 
78 cases have been described in medical literature.

References 

Genetic diseases and disorders
Autosomal dominant disorders